Kostanjevica na Krki (also Kostanjevica ob Krki) is a small town in the historic Lower Carniola region of southern Slovenia. It is the seat of the Municipality of Kostanjevica na Krki. Today it is part of the Lower Sava Statistical Region. It is located in the northern foothills of the Gorjanci Hills near the border with Croatia. The center of the settlement is on an island in the Krka River, and it is also promoted as the "Venice of Lower Carniola" in Slovenian.

Name
The name of the settlement was changed from Kostanjevica to Kostanjevica na Krki in 1955. In the past the German name was Landstraß.

History
The town is protected as a cultural and historical monument. Kostanjevica is the oldest city of the region. In the early 13th century, the Carinthian duke Bernhard von Spanheim established the Fons Sanctae Mariae Cistercian Abbey on the southern frontier of the March of Carniola, which he claimed against the resistance of the Patriarchs of Aquileia and the Dukes of Merania. 

The monastery, a filial of Viktring Abbey near Klagenfurt, was enlarged in a Baroque style in the early 18th century. It was nevertheless finally disbanded in 1785 by the Habsburg emperor Joseph II. 

The settlement of Kostanjevica was first mentioned as a town in 1210 and received market rights in 1249. During the Late Middle Ages it was an important commercial centre in the Duchy of Carniola held by the Habsburg archdukes of Austria. After several devastations by Ottoman military raids in the 15th and 16th centuries, it lost its importance. After the 17th century, it turned into a mostly rural settlement, which however retained its town status. In 2000, it was recognised by the National Assembly as a city.

Mass grave

Kostanjevica na Krki is the location of one of two known mass graves associated with the Second World War in the Krakovo Forest. The sites consist of 10 large mounds and contain the remains of an undetermined number of Croatian prisoners of war, civilians, and possibly German soldiers as well. The site is marked by a large mound with a cross next to it. The grave site was created simultaneously with the Krakovo Forest 1 Mass Grave in neighboring Sajevce. The two sites were created around May 15, 1945, when Partisan forces captured about 4,000 Croatian soldiers and civilians at Dobruška Vas fleeing toward Austria. They were held on the left bank of the Krka River and killed in the forest over the course of a few days; eyewitnesses stated that the victims included children, women, and elderly persons.

Sights

A former monastic complex, which was burned by the Partisans in World War II, has been renovated and now houses the Božidar Jakac Gallery, an art gallery with a sculpture park and a permanent exhibition of works by Božidar Jakac. It is dominated by the Early Gothic abbey church built in 1234.

The town's parish church is dedicated to Saint James and belongs to the Roman Catholic Diocese of Novo Mesto. It is an originally 13th century Romanesque building that was largely rebuilt in the Baroque style in the 17th century. Kostanjevica Cave, a popular tourist destination, is nearby.

Notable people
Notable people that were born or lived in Kostanjevica na Krki include:
Ivan Belle (1867–1924), viticultural and orchard specialist
Božo Borstnik (?–1974), journalist and translator
Franc Bučar (1926–2000), veterinarian and technical writer
Franc Fabinc (1881–1923), educational writer, journalist, and editor
Jože Gorjup (1907–1932), painter, sculptor, and graphic artist
Jože Jankovič (1901–1973), cultural activist
Mirko Kuhelj (1904–1958), writer
Jože Likar (1895–1986), writer and enologist
France Lokar (1917–1994), poet
Anton Makovic (1750–1803), surgeon, member of the national awakening movement and founder of formal education for midwives
Franc Marešič (1750–1801), translator and religious writer
Ivan Oražen (1869–1921), physician
Lenart Pachenecker (?–1581), Cistercian monk and author of the first Catholic Slovenian book
Josef Ressel (1793–1857), Bohemian-Austrian inventor of the screw propeller
Franc Rueh (1887–1968), technical writer and electrical engineer
Niko Sever (1889–?), education specialist
Ilka Vašte (1891–1967), writer
Avgust Žabkar (1854–1930), metalworking industrialist
Radoslav Žargi (1918–1993), physician and specialist in infectious diseases

References

External links

 Kostanjevica na Krki on Geopedia

Populated places in the Municipality of Kostanjevica na Krki
Cities and towns in Lower Carniola